Cryptochloa is a genus of Neotropical plants in the grass family, widespread across much of Mexico, Central America, and South America.

Species
 Cryptochloa capillata (Trin.) Soderstr. - French Guiana, Brazil
 Cryptochloa concinna (Hook.f.) Swallen - Colombia, Central America, southern Mexico
 Cryptochloa decumbens Soderstr. & Zuloaga - Panama
 Cryptochloa dressleri Soderstr. - Panama
 Cryptochloa soderstromii Davidse - Panama
 Cryptochloa strictiflora (E.Fourn.) Swallen - Central America, southern Mexico, Ecuador
 Cryptochloa unispiculata Soderstr. - Bolivia, Peru, Ecuador, Colombia, Brazil (Acre)
 Cryptochloa variana Swallen - Honduras, Panama, Colombia

References

Bambusoideae genera
Grasses of North America
Grasses of South America
Flora of Central America
Grasses of Brazil
Grasses of Mexico
Bambusoideae